The following is a list of players, both past and current, who appeared at least in one game for the New Orleans Hornets/New Orleans Pelicans NBA franchise.



Players
Note: Statistics are correct through the end of the  season.

A to B

|-
|align="left"| || align="center"|C || align="left"|Pittsburgh || align="center"|1 ||  align="center"| || 58 || 1,605 || 514 || 111 || 438 || 27.7 || 8.9 || 1.9 || 7.6 || align=center|
|-
|align="left"| || align="center"|F/C || align="left"| Hyères-Toulon || align="center"|4 ||  align="center"|– || 222 || 3,353 || 1,038 || 130 || 1,330 || 15.1 || 4.7 || 0.6 || 6.0 || align=center|
|-
|align="left"| || align="center"|G || align="left"|Fresno State || align="center"|1 ||  align="center"| || 66 || 1,360 || 118 || 79 || 523 || 20.6 || 1.8 || 1.2 || 7.9 || align=center|
|-
|align="left"| || align="center"|G || align="left"|Virginia Tech || align="center"|3 ||  align="center"|– || 143 || 2,915 || 392 || 330 || 1,414 || 20.4 || 2.7 || 2.3 || 9.9 || align=center|
|-
|align="left"| || align="center"|G/F || align="left"|Oklahoma State || align="center"|1 ||  align="center"| || 22 || 273 || 47 || 9 || 103 || 12.4 || 2.1 || 0.4 || 4.7 || align=center|
|-
|align="left"| || align="center"|F || align="left"|Wake Forest || align="center"|3 ||  align="center"|– || 222 || 5,588 || 1,389 || 283 || 1,526 || 25.2 || 6.3 || 1.3 || 6.9 || align=center|
|-
|align="left"| || align="center"|F/C || align="left"|UNLV || align="center"|2 ||  align="center"|– || 36 || 393 || 113 || 14 || 82 || 10.9 || 3.1 || 0.4 || 2.3 || align=center|
|-
|align="left"| || align="center"|F/C || align="left"|Blinn || align="center"|3 ||  align="center"|– || 104 || 2,034 || 574 || 77 || 680 || 19.6 || 5.5 || 0.7 || 6.5 || align=center|
|-
|align="left"| || align="center"|C || align="left"| FC Barcelona || align="center"|1 ||  align="center"| || 29 || 223 || 50 || 6 || 78 || 7.7 || 1.7 || 0.2 || 2.7 || align=center|
|-
|align="left"| || align="center"|G || align="left"|Georgia Tech || align="center"|1 ||  align="center"| || 23 || 446 || 45 || 77 || 139 || 19.4 || 2.0 || 3.3 || 6.0 || align=center|
|-
|align="left"| || align="center"|F || align="left"|California || align="center"|4 ||  align="center"|– || 230 || 6,981 || 1,352 || 242 || 3,702 || 30.4 || 5.9 || 1.1 || 16.1 || align=center|
|-
|align="left"| || align="center"|F || align="left"|UCLA || align="center"|2 ||  align="center"|– || 116 || 3,950 || 623 || 297 || 1,270 || 34.1 || 5.4 || 2.6 || 10.9 || align=center|
|-
|align="left"| || align="center"|G || align="left"|Fayetteville State || align="center"|2 ||  align="center"|– || 93 || 2,659 || 274 || 376 || 982 || 28.6 || 2.9 || 4.0 || 10.6 || align=center|
|-
|align="left"| || align="center"|F/C || align="left"|UConn || align="center"|4 ||  align="center"|– || 209 || 2,697 || 568 || 78 || 743 || 12.9 || 2.7 || 0.4 || 3.6 || align=center|
|-
|align="left"| || align="center"|C || align="left"| Fenerbahçe || align="center"|4 ||  align="center"|– || 189 || 3,763 || 1,362 || 115 || 929 || 19.9 || 7.2 || 0.6 || 4.9 || align=center|
|-
|align="left"| || align="center"|G/F || align="left"|UNLV || align="center"|2 ||  align="center"|– || 139 || 2,278 || 293 || 154 || 609 || 16.4 || 2.1 || 1.1 || 4.4 || align=center|
|-
|align="left"| || align="center"|C || align="left"| Fuenlabrada || align="center"|1 ||  align="center"| || 54 || 1,088 || 265 || 74 || 319 || 20.1 || 4.9 || 1.4 || 5.9 || align=center|
|-
|align="left"| || align="center"|F || align="left"|Nevada || align="center"|3 ||  align="center"|– || 137 || 2,148 || 347 || 106 || 753 || 15.7 || 2.5 || 0.8 || 5.5 || align=center|
|-
|align="left"| || align="center"|G || align="left"|UCLA || align="center"|2 ||  align="center"|– || 118 || 3772 || 646 || 754 || 1,547 || 32.0 || 5.5 || 6.4 || 13.1 || align=center|
|-
|align="left"| || align="center"|F || align="left"|LSU || align="center"|2 ||  align="center"|– || 50 || 430 || 111 || 6 || 110 || 8.6 || 2.2 || 0.1 || 2.2 || align=center|
|-
|align="left"| || align="center"|F || align="left"|Maryland || align="center"|1 ||  align="center"| || 4 || 36 || 8 || 0 || 6 || 9.0 || 2.0 || 0.0 || 1.5 || align=center|
|-
|align="left"| || align="center"|G || align="left"|Arizona || align="center"|1 ||  align="center"| || 11 || 149 || 15 || 28 || 50 || 13.5 || 1.4 || 2.5 || 4.5 || align=center|
|-
|align="left"| || align="center"|G/F || align="left"| Fortitudo Bologna || align="center"|2 ||  align="center"|– || 146 || 3,923 || 323 || 193 || 1,616 || 26.9 || 2.2 || 1.3 || 11.1 || align=center|
|-
|align="left"| || align="center"|G || align="left"| Olimpia Milano || align="center"|1 ||  align="center"| || 12 || 167 || 9 || 10 || 34 || 13.9 || 0.8 || 0.8 || 2.8 || align=center|
|-
|align="left"| || align="center"|G || align="left"|Kentucky || align="center"|1 ||  align="center"| || 71 || 2,111 || 244 || 268 || 869 || 29.7 || 3.4 || 3.8 || 12.2 || align=center|
|-
|align="left"| || align="center"|F || align="left"|Iowa || align="center"|2 ||  align="center"|– || 74 || 879 || 124 || 34 || 161 || 11.9 || 1.7 || 0.5 || 2.2 || align=center|
|-
|align="left"| || align="center"|G/F || align="left"|Stanford || align="center"|1 ||  align="center"| || 9 || 143 || 26 || 6 || 34 || 15.9 || 2.9 || 0.7 || 3.8 || align=center|
|-
|align="left"| || align="center"|G || align="left"|Cal State Fullerton || align="center"|1 ||  align="center"| || 22 || 328 || 18 || 46 || 145 || 14.9 || 0.8 || 2.1 || 6.6 || align=center|
|-
|align="left"| || align="center"|G || align="left"|UTSA || align="center"|3 ||  align="center"|– || 160 || 3,498 || 479 || 261 || 1,377 || 21.9 || 3.0 || 1.6 || 8.6 || align=center|
|-
|align="left"| || align="center"|F/C || align="left"|Louisiana Tech || align="center"|4 ||  align="center"|– || 315 || 10,559 || 2,675 || 570 || 3,231 || 33.5 || 8.5 || 1.8 || 10.3 || align=center|
|-
|align="left"| || align="center"|G || align="left"|McNeese State || align="center"|1 ||  align="center"| || 3 || 17 || 1 || 2 || 6 || 5.7 || 0.3 || 0.7 || 2.0 || align=center|
|-
|align="left"| || align="center"|G/F || align="left"|La Salle || align="center"|4 ||  align="center"|– || 293 || 7,587 || 859 || 214 || 2,677 || 25.9 || 2.9 || 0.7 || 9.1 || align=center|
|}

C to D

|-
|align="left"| || align="center"|C || align="left"|Clemson || align="center"|1 ||  align="center"| || 41 || 685 || 142 || 42 || 295 || 16.7 || 3.5 || 1.0 || 7.2 || align=center|
|-
|align="left"| || align="center"|G || align="left"|LSU || align="center"|1 ||  align="center"| || 6 || 60 || 8 || 2 || 20 || 10.0 || 1.3 || 0.3 || 3.3 || align=center|
|-
|align="left"| || align="center"|F || align="left"| Maccabi Tel Aviv || align="center"|1 ||  align="center"| || 1 || 24 || 2 || 0 || 12 || 24.0 || 2.0 || 0.0 || 12.0 || align=center|
|-
|align="left"| || align="center"|C || align="left"|Dominguez (CA) || align="center"|3 ||  align="center"|– || 197 || 6,753 || 2,225 || 169 || 2,016 || 34.3 || 11.3 || 0.9 || 10.2 || align=center|
|-
|align="left"| || align="center"|F || align="left"|Arizona State || align="center"|1 ||  align="center"| || 4 || 51 || 9 || 3 || 12 || 12.8 || 2.3 || 0.8 || 3.0 || align=center|
|-
|align="left"| || align="center"|G/F || align="left"|Stanford || align="center"|1 ||  align="center"| || 4 || 24 || 3 || 2 || 0 || 6.0 || 0.8 || 0.5 || 0.0 || align=center|
|-
|align="left"| || align="center"|G || align="left"|Belmont || align="center"|2 ||  align="center"|– || 134 || 2,428 || 216 || 204 || 952 || 18.1 || 1.6 || 1.5 || 7.1 || align=center|
|-
|align="left"| || align="center"|G || align="left"|Hofstra || align="center"|2 ||  align="center"|– || 87 || 2,384 || 224 || 427 || 979 || 27.4 || 2.6 || 4.9 || 11.3 || align=center|
|-
|align="left"| || align="center"|G || align="left"|Cleveland State || align="center"|2 ||  align="center"|– || 73 || 1,881 || 202 || 257 || 755 || 25.8 || 2.8 || 3.5 || 10.3 || align=center|
|-
|align="left"| || align="center"|G || align="left"|UCLA || align="center"|1 ||  align="center"| || 76 || 2,109 || 192 || 432 || 946 || 27.8 || 2.5 || 5.7 || 12.4 || align=center|
|-
|align="left"| || align="center"|G || align="left"|Duke || align="center"|1 ||  align="center"| || 9 || 111 || 4 || 14 || 52 || 12.3 || 0.4 || 1.6 || 5.8 || align=center|
|-
|align="left"| || align="center"|G || align="left"|Dayton || align="center"|1 ||  align="center"| || 13 || 38 || 2 || 1 || 6 || 2.9 || 0.2 || 0.1 || 0.5 || align=center|
|-
|align="left" bgcolor="#FFCC00"|+ || align="center"|F/C || align="left"|Kentucky || align="center"|2 ||  align="center"|– || 65 || 2,311 || 828 || 323 || 1,624 || 35.6 || bgcolor="#CFECEC"|12.7 || 5.0 || 25.0 || align=center|
|-
|align="left"| || align="center"|G || align="left"|Xavier || align="center"|2 ||  align="center"|– || 24 || 495 || 38 || 70 || 300 || 20.6 || 1.6 || 2.9 || 12.5 || align=center|
|-
|align="left"| || align="center"|F || align="left"|Villanova || align="center"|4 ||  align="center"|– || 263 || 6,387 || 962 || 190 || 1,512 || 24.3 || 3.7 || 0.7 || 5.7 || align=center|
|-
|align="left"| || align="center"|G || align="left"|Bowling Green || align="center"|1 ||  align="center"| || 61 || 733 || 55 || 130 || 234 || 12.0 || 0.9 || 2.1 || 3.8 || align=center|
|-
|align="left" bgcolor="#FFCC00"|+ || align="center"|F/C || align="left"|Kentucky || align="center"|7 ||  align="center"|– || 466 || 16,108 || bgcolor="#CFECEC"|4,906 || 982 || bgcolor="#CFECEC"|11,059 || 34.6 || 10.5 || 2.1 || 23.7 || align=center|
|-
|align="left" bgcolor="#FFCC00"|+ || align="center"|G || align="left"|UCLA || align="center"|3 ||  align="center"|– || 135 || 5,168 || 540 || 950 || 2,728 || 38.3 || 4.0 || 7.0 || 20.2 || align=center|
|-
|align="left"| || align="center"|G || align="left"|Iowa State || align="center"|1 ||  align="center"| || 14 || 279 || 48 || 15 || 79 || 19.9 || 3.4 || 1.1 || 5.6 || align=center|
|-
|align="left"| || align="center"|F || align="left"|Kansas || align="center"|3 ||  align="center"|– || 133 || 1,676 || 616 || 56 || 728 || 12.6 || 4.6 || 0.4 || 5.5 || align=center|
|-
|align="left"| || align="center"|G || align="left"|Gonzaga || align="center"|1 ||  align="center"| || 67 || 2,074 || 179 || 346 || 882 || 31.0 || 2.7 || 5.2 || 13.2 || align=center|
|-
|align="left"| || align="center"|G || align="left"|Florida State || align="center"|2 ||  align="center"|– || 73 || 1,439 || 165 || 181 || 582 || 19.7 || 2.3 || 2.5 || 8.0 || align=center|
|-
|align="left"| || align="center"|G || align="left"|Valparaiso || align="center"|2 ||  align="center"|– || 28 || 157 || 19 || 24 || 31 || 5.6 || 0.7 || 0.9 || 1.1 || align=center|
|-
|align="left"| || align="center"|G || align="left"|UCLA || align="center"|1 ||  align="center"| || 7 || 55 || 2 || 8 || 15 || 7.9 || 0.3 || 1.1 || 2.1 || align=center|
|-
|align="left"| || align="center"|G || align="left"|UConn || align="center"|1 ||  align="center"| || 9 || 180 || 19 || 18 || 67 || 20.0 || 2.1 || 2.0 || 7.4 || align=center|
|}

E to H
|-
|align="left"| || align="center"|F || align="left"|Central Connecticut || align="center"|1 ||  align="center"| || 10 || 110 || 25 || 3 || 27 || 11.0 || 2.5 || 0.3 || 2.7 || align=center|
|-
|align="left"| || align="center"|C || align="left"|Fresno State || align="center"|3 ||  align="center"|– || 85 || 1,021 || 210 || 40 || 305 || 12.0 || 2.5 || 0.5 || 3.6 || align=center|
|-
|align="left"| || align="center"|F || align="left"|Long Beach State || align="center"|1 ||  align="center"| || 9 || 282 || 35 || 18 || 143 || 31.3 || 3.9 || 2.0 || 15.9 || align=center|
|-
|align="left"| || align="center"|G/F || align="left"|Memphis || align="center"|4 ||  align="center"|– || 202 || 5,957 || 972 || 1,139 || 2,982 || 29.5 || 4.8 || 5.6 || 14.8 || align=center|
|-
|align="left"| || align="center"|F || align="left"|Georgetown || align="center"|1 ||  align="center"| || 7 || 19 || 2 || 2 || 3 || 2.7 || 0.3 || 0.3 || 0.4 || align=center|
|-
|align="left"| || align="center"|C || align="left"|Georgia Tech || align="center"|1 ||  align="center"| || 51 || 1,243 || 501 || 81 || 459 || 24.4 || 9.8 || 1.6 || 9.0 || align=center|
|-
|align="left"| || align="center"|F || align="left"|Iowa State || align="center"|1 ||  align="center"| || 3 || 39 || 7 || 1 || 20 || 13.0 || 2.3 || 0.3 || 6.7 || align=center|
|-
|align="left"| || align="center"|C || align="left"|Cornell || align="center"|1 ||  align="center"| || 4 || 39 || 6 || 0 || 4 || 9.8 || 1.5 || 0.0 || 1.0 || align=center|
|-
|align="left"| || align="center"|G || align="left"|Penn State || align="center"|3 ||  align="center"|– || 128 || 2,903 || 381 || 661 || 909 || 22.7 || 3.0 || 5.2 || 7.1 || align=center|
|-
|align="left"| || align="center"|G || align="left"|BYU || align="center"|2 ||  align="center"|– || 54 || 522 || 40 || 59 || 180 || 9.7 || 0.7 || 1.1 || 3.3 || align=center|
|-
|align="left"| || align="center"|F || align="left"|Vanderbilt || align="center"|1 ||  align="center"| || 23 || 441 || 61 || 20 || 93 || 19.2 || 2.7 || 0.9 || 4.0 || align=center|
|-
|align="left" bgcolor="#CCFFCC"|x || align="center"|F || align="left"|Kentucky || align="center"|1 ||  align="center"| || 21 || 241 || 54 || 11 || 72 || 11.5 || 2.5 || 0.5 || 3.4 || align=center|
|-
|align="left"| || align="center"|G || align="left"|Saint Joseph's || align="center"|1 ||  align="center"| || 55 || 1,120 || 121 || 65 || 471 || 20.4 || 2.2 || 1.2 || 8.6 || align=center|
|-
|align="left"| || align="center"|G || align="left"| COC Ribeirão Preto || align="center"|1 ||  align="center"| || 8 || 146 || 15 || 18 || 44 || 18.3 || 1.9 || 2.3 || 5.5 || align=center|
|-
|align="left"| || align="center"|G || align="left"|Alabama || align="center"|1 ||  align="center"| || 73 || 1,632 || 245 || 72 || 325 || 22.4 || 3.4 || 1.0 || 4.5 || align=center|
|-
|align="left"| || align="center"|G || align="left"|Kentucky || align="center"|1 ||  align="center"| || 3 || 30 || 0 || 1 || 15 || 10.0 || 0.0 || 0.3 || 5.0 || align=center|
|-
|align="left"| || align="center"|G || align="left"|Indiana || align="center"|5 ||  align="center"|– || 221 || 7,130 || 525 || 726 || 3,390 || 32.3 || 2.4 || 3.3 || 15.3 || align=center|
|-
|align="left"| || align="center"|C || align="left"|Pittsburgh || align="center"|2 ||  align="center"|– || 65 || 792 || 261 || 36 || 215 || 12.2 || 4.0 || 0.6 || 3.3 || align=center|
|-
|align="left"| || align="center"|G || align="left"|LSU || align="center"|1 ||  align="center"| || 2 || 23 || 2 || 2 || 2 || 11.5 || 1.0 || 1.0 || 1.0 || align=center|
|-
|align="left"| || align="center"|G || align="left"|Detroit Mercy || align="center"|1 ||  align="center"| || 77 || 1,674 || 161 || 74 || 672 || 21.7 || 2.1 || 1.0 || 8.7 || align=center|
|-
|align="left"| || align="center"|G/F || align="left"|Texas || align="center"|1 ||  align="center"| || 11 || 304 || 62 || 25 || 125 || 27.6 || 5.6 || 2.3 || 11.4 || align=center|
|-
|align="left"| || align="center"|G || align="left"|Wingate || align="center"|1 ||  align="center"| || 29 || 550 || 63 || 62 || 163 || 19.0 || 2.2 || 2.1 || 5.6 || align=center|
|-
|align="left"| || align="center"|G || align="left"|Oklahoma State || align="center"|1 ||  align="center"| || 13 || 108 || 17 || 7 || 5 || 8.3 || 1.3 || 0.5 || 0.4 || align=center|
|-
|align="left"| || align="center"|G || align="left"|Kentucky || align="center"|1 ||  align="center"| || 6 || 38 || 5 || 7 || 9 || 6.3 || 0.8 || 1.2 || 1.5 || align=center|
|-
|align="left"| || align="center"|G || align="left"|Syracuse || align="center"|1 ||  align="center"| || 4 || 17 || 2 || 5 || 2 || 4.3 || 0.5 || 1.3 || 0.5 || align=center|
|-
|align="left" bgcolor="#CCFFCC"|x || align="center"|F || align="left"|Villanova || align="center"|2 ||  align="center"|– || 112 || 3,104 || 802 || 217 || 1,090 || 27.7 || 7.2 || 1.9 || 9.7 || align=center|
|-
|align="left"| || align="center"|F || align="left"|Indiana || align="center"|1 ||  align="center"| || 12 || 57 || 7 || 3 || 6 || 4.8 || 0.6 || 0.3 || 0.5 || align=center|
|-
|align="left" bgcolor="#CCFFCC"|x || align="center"|C || align="left"|Texas || align="center"|2 ||  align="center"|– || 124 || 2,044 || 516 || 91 || 921 || 16.5 || 4.2 || 0.7 || 7.4 || align=center|
|-
|align="left"| || align="center"|G || align="left"|Kansas || align="center"|2 ||  align="center"|– || 95 || 1,384 || 196 || 48 || 433 || 14.6 || 2.1 || 0.5 || 4.6 || align=center|
|-
|align="left" bgcolor="#CCFFCC"|x || align="center"|C || align="left"| Real Madrid || align="center"|1 ||  align="center"||| 47 || 846 || 334 || 50 || 365 || 18.0 || 7.1 || 1.1 || 7.8 || align=center|
|-
|align="left"| || align="center"|G || align="left"|Oklahoma || align="center"|1 ||  align="center"| || 57 || 1,161 || 166 || 77 || 488 || 20.4 || 2.9 || 1.4 || 8.6 || align=center|
|-
|align="left"| || align="center"|F || align="left"|Arizona || align="center"|3 ||  align="center"|– || 136 || 3,439 || 476 || 218 || 783 || 25.3 || 3.5 || 1.6 || 5.8 || align=center|
|-
|align="left" | || align="center"|G || align="left"|UCLA || align="center"|7 ||  align="center"|– || 415 || 13,913 || 1,728 || 2,833 || 7,321 || 33.5 || 4.2 || 6.8 || 17.6 || align=center|
|}

I to L

|-
|align="left" bgcolor="#FBCEB1"|*  || align="center"|F || align="left"|Duke || align="center"|2 ||  align="center"|– || 123 || 4,197 || 679 || 555 || 2,927 || 34.1 || 5.5 || 4.5 || 23.8 || align=center|
|-
|align="left"| || align="center"|F || align="left"|Kansas State || align="center"|1 ||  align="center"| || 18 || 251 || 46 || 8 || 50 || 13.9 || 2.6 || 0.4 || 2.8 || align=center|
|-
|align="left"| || align="center"|G || align="left"|Georgia Tech || align="center"|3 ||  align="center"|– || 117 || 2,938 || 307 || 473 || 1,301 || 25.1 || 2.6 || 4.0 || 11.1 || align=center|
|-
|align="left"| || align="center"|G || align="left"|Minnesota || align="center"|2 ||  align="center"|– || 102 || 2,221 || 288 || 217 || 917 || 21.8 || 2.8 || 2.1 || 9.0 || align=center|
|-
|align="left" | || align="center"|G || align="left"|Duke || align="center"|2 ||  align="center"|– || 120 || 1,966 || 217 || 130 || 866 || 16.4 || 1.8 || 1.1 || 7.2 || align=center|
|-
|align="left"| || align="center"|C || align="left"|Temple || align="center"|2 ||  align="center"|– || 83 || 1,619 || 320 || 80 || 653 || 19.5 || 3.9 || 1.0 || 7.9 || align=center|
|-
|align="left"| || align="center"|G/F || align="left"|Stanford || align="center"|1 ||  align="center"| || 44 || 1,030 || 100 || 76 || 335 || 23.4 || 2.3 || 1.7 || 7.6 || align=center|
|-
|align="left"| || align="center"|G || align="left"|Duquesne || align="center"|2 ||  align="center"|– || 29 || 257 || 24 || 14 || 77 || 8.9 || 0.8 || 0.5 || 2.7 || align=center|
|-
|align="left"| || align="center"|G || align="left"|Lamar || align="center"|1 ||  align="center"| || 4 || 18 || 1 || 6 || 4 || 4.5 || 0.3 || 1.5 || 1.0 || align=center|
|-
|align="left"| || align="center"|G || align="left"|UAB || align="center"|1 ||  align="center"| || 15 || 119 || 9 || 22 || 27 || 7.9 || 0.6 || 1.5 || 1.8 || align=center|
|-
|align="left"| || align="center"|C || align="left"|LSU || align="center"|1 ||  align="center"| || 7 || 82 || 22 || 1 || 23 || 11.7 || 3.1 || 0.1 || 3.3 || align=center|
|-
|align="left"| || align="center"|F || align="left"|Wake Forest || align="center"|1 ||  align="center"| || 22 || 539 || 91 || 48 || 202 || 24.5 || 4.1 || 2.2 || 9.2 || align=center|
|-
|align="left"| || align="center"|F || align="left"|Tulane || align="center"|2 ||  align="center"|– || 81 || 1,209 || 278 || 30 || 368 || 14.9 || 3.4 || 0.4 || 4.5 || align=center|
|-
|align="left"| || align="center"|G || align="left"|UC Santa Barbara || align="center"|1 ||  align="center"| || 5 || 54 || 6 || 2 || 10 || 10.8 || 1.2 || 0.4 || 2.0 || align=center|
|-
|align="left"| || align="center"|F || align="left"|Arizona || align="center"|1 ||  align="center"| || 18 || 247 || 42 || 28 || 96 || 13.7 || 2.3 || 1.6 || 5.3 || align=center|
|-
|align="left"| || align="center"|G || align="left"|Jackson State || align="center"|1 ||  align="center"| || 11 || 61 || 12 || 4 || 21 || 5.5 || 1.1 || 0.4 || 1.9 || align=center|
|-
|align="left"| || align="center"|G/F || align="left"|Syracuse || align="center"|1 ||  align="center"| || 26 || 377 || 54 || 16 || 95 || 14.5 || 2.1 || 0.6 || 3.7 || align=center|
|-
|align="left"| || align="center"|G || align="left"|Texas A&M || align="center"|1 ||  align="center"| || 4 || 19 || 3 || 0 || 5 || 4.8 || 0.8 || 0.0 || 1.3 || align=center|
|-
|align="left"| || align="center"|F || align="left"|South Florida || align="center"|1 ||  align="center"| || 11 || 196 || 41 || 7 || 61 || 17.8 || 3.7 || 0.6 || 5.5 || align=center|
|-
|align="left"| || align="center"|F || align="left"|Kentucky || align="center"|1 ||  align="center"| || 51 || 1,264 || 303 || 59 || 584 || 24.8 || 5.9 || 1.2 || 11.5 || align=center|
|-
|align="left"| || align="center"|C || align="left"|Central Michigan || align="center"|1 ||  align="center"| || 47 || 1,372 || 364 || 101 || 616 || 29.2 || 7.7 || 2.1 || 13.1 || align=center|
|-
|align="left"| || align="center"|C || align="left"| Real Madrid || align="center"|2 ||  align="center"|– || 23 || 277 || 61 || 12 || 71 || 12.0 || 2.7 || 0.5 || 3.1 || align=center|
|-
|align="left"| || align="center"|F || align="left"|Purdue || align="center"|2 ||  align="center"|– || 64 || 1,601 || 308 || 51 || 783 || 25.0 || 4.8 || 0.8 || 12.2 || align=center|
|-
|align="left"| || align="center"|G || align="left"|Bradley || align="center"|1 ||  align="center"| || 5 || 35 || 2 || 5 || 17 || 7.0 || 0.4 || 1.0 || 3.4 || align=center|
|-
|align="left" bgcolor="#CCFFCC"|x || align="center"|G || align="left"|Alabama || align="center"|1 ||  align="center"| || 54 || 904 || 71 || 124 || 343 || 16.7 || 1.3 || 2.3 || 6.4 || align=center|
|-
|align="left"| || align="center"|G || align="left"|Kentucky || align="center"|1 ||  align="center"| || 27 || 244 || 26 || 21 || 44 || 9.0 || 1.0 || 0.8 || 1.6 || align=center|
|-
|align="left"| || align="center"|G || align="left"|LSU || align="center"|1 ||  align="center"| || 2 || 12 || 0 || 1 || 6 || 6.0 || 0.0 || 0.5 || 3.0 || align=center|
|-
|align="left"| || align="center"|C || align="left"|Stanford || align="center"|1 ||  align="center"| || 82 || 2,136 || 462 || 64 || 929 || 26.0 || 5.6 || 0.8 || 11.3 || align=center|
|-
|align="left" bgcolor="#CCFFCC"|x || align="center"|F || align="left"| Sydney Kings || align="center"|1 ||  align="center"| || 3 || 56 || 3 || 3 || 8 || 18.7 || 1.0 || 1.0 || 2.7 || align=center|
|-
|align="left"| || align="center"|F || align="left"|North Carolina || align="center"|3 ||  align="center"|– || 203 || 4,131 || 839 || 309 || 902 || 20.3 || 4.1 || 1.5 || 4.4 || align=center|
|}

M to N

|-
|align="left"| || align="center"|G || align="left"| Saski Baskonia || align="center"|1 ||  align="center"| || 19 || 135 || 10 || 5 || 44 || 7.1 || 0.5 || 0.3 || 2.3 || align=center|
|-
|align="left" bgcolor="#FFCC00"|+ || align="center"|C || align="left"|Kentucky || align="center"|3 ||  align="center"|– || 187 || 5,923 || 1,776 || 203 || 2,230 || 31.7 || 9.5 || 1.1 || 11.9 || align=center|
|-
|align="left"| || align="center"|C || align="left"|Tulsa || align="center"|1 ||  align="center"| || 1 || 3 || 0 || 0|| 0 || 3.0 || 0.0 || 0.0 || 0.0 || align=center|
|-
|align="left"| || align="center"|F/C || align="left"|California || align="center"|2 ||  align="center"|– || 74 || 913 || 210 || 16 || 202 || 12.3 || 2.8 || 0.2 || 2.7 || align=center|
|-
|align="left" bgcolor="#CCFFCC"|x || align="center"|F || align="left"|Xavier || align="center"|1 ||  align="center"| || 32 || 700 || 148 || 88 || 246 || 21.9 || 4.6 || 2.8 || 7.7 || align=center|
|-
|align="left" bgcolor="#FFCC00"|+ || align="center"|F || align="left"|Kentucky || align="center"|2 ||  align="center"|– || 101 || 4,051 || 615 || 509 || 2,168 || bgcolor="#CFECEC"|40.1 || 6.1 || 5.0 || 21.5 || align=center|
|-
|align="left"| || align="center"|F || align="left"|Oklahoma State || align="center"|2 ||  align="center"|– || 145 || 4,677 || 643 || 181 || 1,785 || 32.3 || 4.4 || 1.2 || 12.3 || align=center|
|-
|align="left"| || align="center"|G || align="left"|Virginia || align="center"|1 ||  align="center"| || 69 || 1,219 || 132 || 74 || 369 || 17.7 || 1.9 || 1.1 || 5.3 || align=center|
|-
|align="left"| || align="center"|C || align="left"| Spirou Charleroi || align="center"|1 ||  align="center"| || 41 || 330 || 86 || 6 || 59 || 8.0 || 2.1 || 0.1 || 1.4 || align=center|
|-
|align="left"| || align="center"|F || align="left"|Fresno State || align="center"|1 ||  align="center"| || 9 || 145 || 28 || 9 || 19 || 16.1 || 3.1 || 1.0 || 2.1 || align=center|
|-
|align="left"| || align="center"|G || align="left"|Wichita State || align="center"|1 ||  align="center"| || 4 || 43 || 1 || 13 || 6 || 10.8 || 0.3 || 3.3 || 1.5 || align=center|
|-
|align="left"| || align="center"|F/C || align="left"| Fenerbahçe  || align="center"|2 ||  align="center"|– || 82 || 1,283 || 237 || 107 || 438 || 15.6 || 2.9 || 1.3 || 5.3 || align=center|
|-
|align="left"| || align="center"|F || align="left"|George Washington || align="center"|1 ||  align="center"| || 7 || 35 || 11 || 2 || 2 || 5.0 || 1.6 || 0.3 || 0.3 || align=center|
|-
|align="left"| || align="center"|F || align="left"|Kentucky || align="center"|5 ||  align="center"|–– || 253 || 5,161 || 423 || 346 || 1,524 || 20.4 || 1.7 || 1.4 || 6.0 || align=center|
|-
|align="left"| || align="center"|F || align="left"| Real Madrid || align="center"|2 ||  align="center"|– || 62 || 1,797 || 510 || 76 || 973 || 29.0 || 8.2 || 1.2 || 15.7 || align=center|
|-
|align="left"| || align="center"|F/C || align="left"|UCLA || align="center"|1 ||  align="center"| || 51 || 644 || 178 || 22 || 205 || 12.6 || 3.5 || 0.4 || 4.0 || align=center|
|-
|align="left"| || align="center"|G || align="left"|Purdue || align="center"|4 ||  align="center"|– || 264 || 6,889 || 658 || 531 || 2,821 || 26.1 || 2.5 || 2.0 || 10.7 || align=center|
|-
|align="left"| || align="center"|G || align="left"|Georgia Tech || align="center"|1 ||  align="center"| || 76 || 1,426 || 140 || 59 || 636 || 18.8 || 1.8 || 0.8 || 8.4 || align=center|
|-
|align="left"| || align="center"|F/C || align="left"| Pallacanestro Treviso || align="center"|1 ||  align="center"| || 34 || 479 || 101 || 32 || 150 || 14.1 || 3.0 || 0.9 || 4.4 || align=center|
|-
|align="left"| || align="center"|F || align="left"| Pallacanestro Treviso || align="center"|2 ||  align="center"|– || 80 || 1,542 || 201 || 87 || 571 || 19.3 || 2.5 || 1.1 || 7.1 || align=center|
|-
|align="left"| || align="center"|F || align="left"|TCU || align="center"|1 ||  align="center"| || 68 || 2,017 || 298 || 109 || 963 || 29.7 || 4.4 || 1.6 || 14.2 || align=center|
|-
|align="left"| || align="center"|G || align="left"|Saint Joseph's || align="center"|1 ||  align="center"| || 43 || 897 || 96 || 156 || 221 || 20.9 || 2.2 || 3.6 || 5.1 || align=center|
|-
|align="left"| || align="center"|G || align="left"|West Florida || align="center"|1 ||  align="center"| || 16 || 183 || 20 || 21 || 60 || 11.4 || 1.3 || 1.3 || 3.8 || align=center|
|-
|align="left"| || align="center"|F || align="left"|UC Santa Barbara || align="center"|1 ||  align="center"| || 9 || 48 || 9 || 3 || 15 || 5.3 || 1.0 || 0.3 || 1.7 || align=center|
|}

O to S

|-
|align="left"| || align="center"|F/C || align="left"|UConn || align="center"|4 ||  align="center"|– || 207 || 5,791 || 1,759 || 129 || 1,975 || 28.0 || 8.5 || 0.6 || 9.5 || align=center|
|-
|align="left"| || align="center"|C || align="left"|Duke || align="center"|2 ||  align="center"|– || 89 || 1,402 || 405 || 77 || 727 || 15.8 || 4.6 || 0.9 || 8.2 || align=center|
|-
|align="left"| || align="center"|C || align="left"|Syracuse || align="center"|1 ||  align="center"| || 3 || 25 || 7 || 3 || 3 || 8.3 || 2.3 || 1.0 || 1.0 || align=center|
|-
|align="left"| || align="center"|G || align="left"|USC || align="center"|1 ||  align="center"| || 28 || 440 || 51 || 81 || 145 || 15.7 || 1.8 || 2.9 || 5.2 || align=center|
|-
|align="left"| || align="center"|G || align="left"|Arkansas || align="center"|2 ||  align="center"|– || 162 || 3,207 || 310 || 395 || 1,395 || 19.8 || 1.9 || 2.4 || 8.6 || align=center|
|-
|align="left" bgcolor="#FFCC00"|+ || align="center"|G || align="left"|Wake Forest || align="center"|6 ||  align="center"|– || 425 || 15,761 || 1,951 || bgcolor="#CFECEC"|4,228 || 7,936 || 37.1 || 4.6 || bgcolor="#CFECEC"|9.9 || 18.7 || align=center|
|-
|align="left"| || align="center"|G/F || align="left"| KK Budućnost || align="center"|1 ||  align="center"| || 4 || 50 || 6 || 6 || 4 || 12.5 || 1.5 || 1.5 || 1.0 || align=center|
|-
|align="left"| || align="center"|G || align="left"|Louisiana || align="center"|1 ||  align="center"| || 42 || 1,250 || 220 || 320 || 446 || 29.8 || 5.2 || 7.6 || 10.6 || align=center|
|-
|align="left"| || align="center"|C || align="left"|Beaumont HS (TX) || align="center"|1 ||  align="center"| || 37 || 542 || 128 || 31 || 91 || 14.6 || 3.5 || 0.8 || 2.5 || align=center|
|-
|align="left"| || align="center"|F || align="left"|Michigan State || align="center"|3 ||  align="center"|– || 165 || 3,284 || 416 || 124 || 1,126 || 19.9 || 2.5 || 0.8 || 6.8 || align=center|
|-
|align="left"| || align="center"|G/F || align="left"|Washington || align="center"|2 ||  align="center"| || 111 || 1,987 || 226 || 94 || 592 || 17.9 || 2.0 || 0.8 || 5.3 || align=center|
|-
|align="left"| || align="center"|G/F || align="left"|Xavier || align="center"|2 ||  align="center"|– || 152 || 3,871 || 691 || 199 || 1,067 || 25.5 || 4.5 || 1.3 || 7.0 || align=center|
|-
|align="left"| || align="center"|F/C || align="left"|Kentucky || align="center"|1 ||  align="center"| || 73 || 2,232 || 634 || 229 || 1,565 || 30.6 || 8.7 || 3.1 || 21.4 || align=center|
|-
|align="left"| || align="center"|G || align="left"|Duke || align="center"|2 ||  align="center"|– || 91 || 2,157 || 203 || 159 || 1,187 || 23.7 || 2.2 || 1.7 || 13.0 || align=center|
|-
|align="left"| || align="center"|G || align="left"|Duke || align="center"|3 ||  align="center"|– || 165 || 3,529 || 306 || 374 || 1,146 || 21.4 || 1.9 || 2.3 || 6.9 || align=center|
|-
|align="left"| || align="center"|G || align="left"|Dayton || align="center"|2 ||  align="center"|– || 150 || 2,991 || 233 || 453 || 1,232 || 19.9 || 1.6 || 3.0 || 8.2 || align=center|
|-
|align="left"| || align="center"|G || align="left"|Washington || align="center"|1 ||  align="center"| || 2 || 23 || 0 || 4 || 0 || 11.5 || 0.0 || 2.0 || 0.0 || align=center|
|-
|align="left"| || align="center"|F || align="left"|Wake Forest || align="center"|1 ||  align="center"| || 30 || 882 || 142 || 60 || 275 || 29.4 || 4.7 || 2.0 || 9.2 || align=center|
|-
|align="left"| || align="center"|G || align="left"|Kentucky || align="center"|1 ||  align="center"| || 65 || 1,705 || 263 || 533 || 537 || 26.2 || 4.0 || 8.2 || 8.3 || align=center|
|-
|align="left"| || align="center"|C || align="left"|Arizona || align="center"|1 ||  align="center"| || 35 || 325 || 50 || 11 || 80 || 9.3 || 1.4 || 0.3 || 2.3 || align=center|
|-
|align="left"| || align="center"|G || align="left"|Miami (FL) || align="center"|1 ||  align="center"| || 21 || 270 || 21 || 13 || 42 || 12.9 || 1.0 || 0.6 || 2.0 || align=center|
|-
|align="left"| || align="center"|G/F || align="left"|Kansas || align="center"|1 ||  align="center"| || 3 || 47 || 5 || 1 || 16 || 15.7 || 1.7 || 0.3 || 5.3 || align=center|
|-
|align="left"| || align="center"|F || align="left"|NC State || align="center"|1 ||  align="center"| || 43 || 534 || 107 || 12 || 126 || 12.4 || 2.5 || 0.3 || 2.9 || align=center|
|-
|align="left"| || align="center"|C || align="left"|Georgetown || align="center"|1 ||  align="center"| || 2 || 5 || 2 || 0 || 4 || 2.5 || 1.0 || 0.0 || 2.0 || align=center|
|-
|align="left"| || align="center"|G || align="left"|Texas A&M || align="center"|2 ||  align="center"|– || 6 || 47 || 3 || 9 || 12 || 7.8 || 0.5 || 1.5 || 2.0 || align=center|
|-
|align="left"| || align="center"|G || align="left"|Wake Forest || align="center"|1 ||  align="center"| || 27 || 617 || 92 || 154 || 239 || 22.9 || 3.4 || 5.7 || 8.9 || align=center|
|-
|align="left"| || align="center"|G/F || align="left"|Saint Benedict's Prep. (NJ) || align="center"|2 ||  align="center"|– || 131 || 2,848 || 262 || 200 || 1,205 || 21.7 || 2.0 || 1.5 || 9.2 || align=center|
|-
|align="left"| || align="center"|F/C || align="left"|Colorado State || align="center"|5 ||  align="center"|– || 201 || 3,775 || 808 || 134 || 1,456 || 18.8 || 4.0 || 0.7 || 7.2 || align=center|
|-
|align="left"| || align="center"|F || align="left"|Oak Hill Academy (VA) || align="center"|1 ||  align="center"| || 3 || 12 || 4 || 0 || 2 || 4.0 || 1.3 || 0.0 || 0.7 || align=center|
|-
|align="left"| || align="center"|G || align="left"|Louisville || align="center"|1 ||  align="center"| || 6 || 29 || 3 || 2 || 5 || 4.8 || 0.5 || 0.3 || 0.8 || align=center|
|-
|align="left"| || align="center"|G || align="left"|Michigan State || align="center"|1 ||  align="center"| || 71 || 929 || 81 || 56 || 358 || 13.1 || 1.1 || 0.8 || 5.0 || align=center|
|-
|align="left"| || align="center"|G || align="left"|Nevada || align="center"|1 ||  align="center"| || 68 || 1,310 || 161 || 102 || 542 || 19.3 || 2.4 || 1.5 || 8.0 || align=center|
|-
|align="left"| || align="center"|F || align="left"|Wake Forest || align="center"|1 ||  align="center"| || 75 || 1,410 || 232 || 70 || 543 || 18.8 || 3.1 || 0.9 || 7.2 || align=center|
|-
|align="left"| || align="center"|F || align="left"|Syracuse || align="center"|1 ||  align="center"| || 3 || 27 || 8 || 0 || 14 || 9.0 || 2.7 || 0.0 || 4.7 || align=center|
|-
|align="left"| || align="center"|G/F || align="left"|Cincinnati || align="center"|1 ||  align="center"| || 6 || 162 || 18 || 29 || 58 || 27.0 || 3.0 || 4.8 || 9.7 || align=center|
|-
|align="left"| || align="center"|C || align="left"|Wisconsin || align="center"|1 ||  align="center"| || 55 || 1,007 || 226 || 36 || 159 || 18.3 || 4.1 || 0.7 || 2.9 || align=center|
|-
|align="left"| || align="center"|G/F || align="left"| PAOK || align="center"|5 ||  align="center"|– || 219 || 7,261 || 882 || 280 || 3,135 || 33.2 || 4.0 || 1.3 || 14.3 || align=center|
|-
|align="left"| || align="center"|F || align="left"|Georgetown || align="center"|1 ||  align="center"| || 15 || 209 || 23 || 10 || 68 || 13.9 || 1.5 || 0.7 || 4.5 || align=center|
|}

T to W

|-
|align="left"| || align="center"|G || align="left"|Washington || align="center"|1 ||  align="center"| || 3 || 48 || 4 || 5 || 23 || 16.0 || 1.3 || 1.7 || 7.7 || align=center|
|-
|align="left"| || align="center"|F || align="left"|Duke || align="center"|3 ||  align="center"|– || 106 || 1,318 || 248 || 32 || 321 || 12.4 || 2.3 || 0.3 || 3.0 || align=center|
|-
|align="left"| || align="center"|G/F || align="left"|Georgetown || align="center"|1 ||  align="center"| || 9 || 191 || 28 || 9 || 34 || 21.2 || 3.1 || 1.0 || 3.8 || align=center|
|-
|align="left"| || align="center"|G || align="left"|LSU || align="center"|2 ||  align="center"|– || 119 || 2,617 || 342 || 157 || 1,416 || 22.0 || 2.9 || 1.3 || 11.9 || align=center|
|-
|align="left"| || align="center"|G/F || align="left"|South Carolina || align="center"|2 ||  align="center"|– || 16 || 108 || 9 || 8 || 33 || 6.8 || 0.6 || 0.5 || 2.1 || align=center|
|-
|align="left"| || align="center"|G/F || align="left"| SIG Strasbourg || align="center"|1 ||  align="center"| || 2 || 41 || 1 || 0 || 11 || 20.5 || 0.5 || 0.0 || 5.5 || align=center|
|-
|align="left"| || align="center"|F || align="left"|Michigan || align="center"|2 ||  align="center"|– || 140 || 1,793 || 524 || 93 || 630 || 12.8 || 3.7 || 0.7 || 4.5 || align=center|
|-
|align="left"| || align="center"|G || align="left"|Maryland || align="center"|2 ||  align="center"|– || 144 || 4,391 || 510 || 1,063 || 1,672 || 30.5 || 3.5 || 7.4 || 11.6 || align=center|
|-
|align="left"| || align="center"|F || align="left"| São Carlos || align="center"|2 ||  align="center"|– || 26 || 172 || 19 || 7 || 50 || 6.6 || 0.7 || 0.3 || 1.9 || align=center|
|-
|align="left"| || align="center"|F/C || align="left"|Iowa State || align="center"|2 ||  align="center"|– || 77 || 1,054 || 248 || 44 || 269 || 13.7 || 3.2 || 0.6 || 3.5 || align=center|
|-
|align="left"| || align="center"|F || align="left"|Syracuse || align="center"|1 ||  align="center"| || 1 || 7 || 0 || 0 || 4 || 7.0 || 0.0 || 0.0 || 4.0 || align=center|
|-
|align="left"| || align="center"|C || align="left"|Syracuse || align="center"|1 ||  align="center"| || 5 || 98 || 27 || 3 || 23 || 19.6 || 5.4 || 0.6 || 4.6 || align=center|
|-
|align="left"| || align="center"|G/F || align="left"|Ball State || align="center"|1 ||  align="center"| || 22 || 438 || 71 || 17 || 193 || 19.9 || 3.2 || 0.8 || 8.8 || align=center|
|-
|align="left"| || align="center"|G || align="left"|Baylor || align="center"|3 ||  align="center"|– || 160 || 5,645 || 394 || 535 || 2,429 || 35.3 || 2.5 || 3.3 || 15.2 || align=center|
|-
|align="left" bgcolor="#FFCC00"|+ || align="center"|F/C || align="left"|Xavier || align="center" bgcolor="#CFECEC"|8 ||  align="center"|– || bgcolor="#CFECEC"|530 || bgcolor="#CFECEC"|17,160 || 3,853 || 1,042 || 8,690 || 32.4 || 7.3 || 2.0 || 16.4 || align=center|
|-
|align="left"| || align="center"|F/C || align="left"|Xavier || align="center"|1 ||  align="center"| || 34 || 692 || 166 || 16 || 197 || 20.4 || 4.9 || 0.5 || 5.8 || align=center|
|-
|align="left"| || align="center"|G || align="left"|Memphis || align="center"|1 ||  align="center"| || 8 || 77 || 5 || 8 || 19 || 9.6 || 0.6 || 1.0 || 2.4 || align=center|
|-
|align="left"| || align="center"|F || align="left"|TCU || align="center"|2 ||  align="center"|– || 85 || 1,911 || 405 || 140 || 415 || 22.5 || 4.8 || 1.6 || 4.9 || align=center|
|-
|align="left"| || align="center"|G/F || align="left"|Georgetown || align="center"|1 ||  align="center"| || 6 || 79 || 6 || 4 || 27 || 13.2 || 1.0 || 0.7 || 4.5 || align=center|
|-
|align="left"| || align="center"|G || align="left"|North Carolina || align="center"|1 ||  align="center"| || 16 || 238 || 17 || 52 || 72 || 14.9 || 1.1 || 3.3 || 4.5 || align=center|
|-
|align="left" bgcolor="#FBCEB1"|* || align="center"|F || align="left"|Duke || align="center"|2 ||  align="center"|– || 85 || 2,694 || 591 || 276 || 2,187 || 31.7 || 7.0 || 3.2 || bgcolor="#CFECEC"| 25.7 || align=center|
|-
|align="left"| || align="center"|C || align="left"|Kansas || align="center"|2 ||  align="center"|– || 95 || 943 || 214 || 37 || 288 || 9.9 || 2.3 || 0.4 || 3.0 || align=center|
|-
|align="left"| || align="center"|G || align="left"|South Dakota State || align="center"|1 ||  align="center"| || 10 || 105 || 18 || 11 || 17 || 10.5 || 1.8 || 1.1 || 1.7 || align=center|
|-
|align="left"| || align="center"|F || align="left"|UNLV || align="center"|1 ||  align="center"| || 8 || 189 || 63 || 6 || 135 || 23.6 || 7.9 || 0.8 || 16.9 || align=center|
|-
|align="left"| || align="center"|F || align="left"|Kansas || align="center"|3 ||  align="center"|– || 179 || 2,283 || 413 || 124 || 719 || 12.8 || 2.3 || 0.7 || 4.0 || align=center|
|}

External links
New Orleans Pelicans all-time roster

References

National Basketball Association all-time rosters

All-time roster
List